Atley Hill is a hamlet in the Hambleton district of North Yorkshire, England. It is situated on the B1263 road between the A167 and the village of Scorton.

There is a pub called "The Arden Arms", it has closed and reopened several times over the last decade, the main reasons for the closures being the drink driving laws, lack of rural public transport and the general decline of the rural economy.  Currently run by landlord Alex Liddle.

Situated on Atley Hill above the current settlement was the (abandoned) Medieval village of Atley Cowton.

Hamlets in North Yorkshire